Goniocraspedon is a genus of moths of the family Erebidae described by George Hampson in 1993.

Species
Goniocraspedon mistura Swinhoe, 1891
Goniocraspedon subdentata Schaus, 1911

References

Calpinae
Moth genera